Warren Lynch (1896–1970) was an American cinematographer and stills photographer.

Selected filmography
 Murder in the Clouds (1934)
 The Widow from Monte Carlo (1935)
 Smart Blonde (1937)
 Midnight Court (1937)
 Over the Goal(1937)
 Blondes at Work (1938)
 Torchy Gets Her Man (1938)
 Torchy Blane in Chinatown (1939)
 Torchy Runs for Mayor (1939)
 The Tanks Are Coming (1951)
 Retreat, Hell! (1952)

References

Bibliography 
 Joel Finler. Hollywood Movie Stills: Art and Technique in the Golden Age of the Studios. Reynolds & Hearn, 2008.

External links 
 

1896 births
1970 deaths
People from Washington, Indiana
American cinematographers